In geometry, the small stellated truncated dodecahedron (or quasitruncated small stellated dodecahedron or small stellatruncated dodecahedron) is a nonconvex uniform polyhedron, indexed as U58. It has 24 faces (12 pentagons and 12 decagrams), 90 edges, and 60 vertices. It is given a Schläfli symbol t{,5}, and Coxeter diagram .

Related polyhedra 

It shares its vertex arrangement with three other uniform polyhedra: the convex rhombicosidodecahedron, the small dodecicosidodecahedron and the small rhombidodecahedron.

It also has the same vertex arrangement as the uniform compounds of 6 or 12 pentagrammic prisms.

See also 
 List of uniform polyhedra

References

External links 
 

Uniform polyhedra